This list of fictional animals contains notable fictional animals of species that do not have a separate list among either the lists of fictional animals or the lists of fictional species.

Mammals

Aardvarks
Aardvark from The Ant and the Aardvark
Aardvarkina, a twin sister aardvark in Princess Tutu
Arnie the aardvark in Boner's Ark.
Arthur Read, the titular character of books and the animation show, Arthur.
Cerebus the Aardvark, the titular comic book character.
Cyril Sneer, aardvark and the main villain of The Raccoons
Otis the Aardvark, a former puppet presenter on CBBC.
Slurpy, a baby aardvark in Wild Kratts

Bats
Bartok, Rasputin's bat henchman from the musical Anastasia and a direct-to-video spinoff Bartok the Magnificent
Bat-Bat, superhero bat parody of Batman, from Mighty Mouse: The New Adventures
Batfink, a superhero bat with steel wings from the show, Batfink.
Batty Koda, a fruit bat voiced by Robin Williams from FernGully: The Last Rainforest.
Bats, a group of bats who try to eat Evinrude in The Rescuers
Benny, a bat who appeared in Bear in the Big Blue House, recycled by Leah the Fruit Bat from Jim Henson’s The Animal Show
Bertie, a bat who helps his friends to save the environment. Series narrated by Bernard Cribbins.
 Bewitched, Bothered and Bemildred, three bats in Walt Kelly's Pogo. 
Chichon, in 801 T.T.S. Airbats
Desert Bat, in Blade of the Phantom Master
Dingbat, The 3 Stooges pet in the first episode of The New Scooby Doo Movies
Fidget, the peg-legged bat with a crippled wing, from The Great Mouse Detective
Elmo Bat, a bat variation of Elmo imagined by Dorothy in the Elmo's World episode Sleep
Foxglove, a pink bat from Chip 'n Dale: Rescue Rangers
Fu-Fu, a bat in Sagwa, the Chinese Siamese Cat
Fangs, Lucy Loud's pet bat in The Loud House
Rosita, la Monstrua de las Cuevas, a fruit bat on Sesame Street
Rouge, a bat in the Sonic series
Sen, a bat in Shoulder-a-Coffin Kuro
Shade, Marina, and Goth, from the Silverwing novels and animated adaptation
Stellaluna, a fruit bat in Janell Cannon's book of the same name.
Stupid Bat, Witchiepoo's dim-witted assistant, from H.R. Pufnstuf
Yami-Maru, in Millenium Snow

Carnivorans (mostly carnivorous mammals)

Bears
See List of fictional bears

Canines
See List of fictional canines
See also List of fictional dogs
See also List of fictional wolves

Felines
See List of fictional cats and other felines
See also List of fictional big cats

Hyenas

 Aardwolves in The Lion Guard
Bud and Lou, the pet hyenas of The Joker on the cartoon series, Krypto the Superdog
Flame Hyenard, robotic hyena humanoid from Mega Man X7
Haida, a spotted hyena in the Sanrio anime series Aggretsuko. 
Hardy Har Har, a hyena in Lippy the Lion & Hardy Har Har
Hyena, the name of two fictional supervillains from a comic published by DC Comics
Janja and Jasiri, two hyenas from The Lion Guard.
Scratch & Sniff, played by Don Austen & John Eccleston, virtual recreations of their past characters- "Bro & Bro", the wolves, who they played on former Saturday Morning show What's Up Doc? between 1992 and 1995, and spin-off series Wolf It between 1993 and 1996
Shenzi, Banzai, and Ed, the laughing, talking hyenas from Disney's The Lion King. In The Lion King (2019 film), Shenzi (voiced by Florence Kasumba) is a matriarch, while Banzai and Ed had their names changed to Kamari (voiced by Keegan-Michael Key) and Azizi (voiced by Eric Andre) who are both her subordinates. Unlike the 1994 animated counterpart, Azizi is the third hyena who talks and always gets into Kamari's personal space.
The Hyena from the comic strip Boner's Ark
Zig, a brown hyena from Zig and Sharko
Harry the Hyena ("secret agent H") from the Phineas and Ferb episode "The O.W.C.A. Files"

Mongooses (including meerkats)

Alexsandr Orlov, an aristocratic Russian meerkat from the advertising campaign Compare the Meerkat, as well as his sidekick Sergei and various other meerkat characters
Billy, a meerkat from German animated film Animals United
 Komiya, a meerkat from Sanrio's anime series Aggretsuko
 Meer, a meerkat that grows to 8 meters tall in the anime Teekyuu 2
Mina Mongoose and Ash Mongoose, from the Sonic the Hedgehog comic series
Patsy Smiles, a mongoose in Camp Lazlo
Rikki-tikki-tavi, a mongoose from the short story "Rikki-Tikki-Tavi",  from The Jungle Book by Rudyard Kipling
Sunil Nevla, a banded mongoose from the 2012 TV series, Littlest Pet Shop.
Timon, a meerkat in Disney's The Lion King movies and media franchise. He is voiced by Nathan Lane in the 1994 animated film and Billy Eichner in the 2019 remake.

Musteloids (including mustelids, raccoons, skunks, red pandas, etc)
See List of fictional musteloids
See List of fictional badgers and List of fictional raccoons

Pinnipeds (walruses, seals, sea lions)
See List of fictional pinnipeds

Eulipotyphlans (hedgehogs, moles, shrews, desmans, etc.)
Alfred, from the animated series The Mysteries of Alfred Hedgehog
Amy Rose, from the Sonic the Hedgehog series
Brigadier Verboten, the local sheriff in Raymond Macherot's comic strip Sibylline.
Brownie, the blue and yellow hedgehog from the Sanrio Jewelpet series, he resembles Brownie Quartz and has the power of imagination.
Chucky, a hedgehog in Shirobako
Digger Mole, a mole in Shirt Tales
Eileen, a mole who works at a coffee shop in Regular Show
 Hubert the hedgehog, character in a pantomime comic by Jan Romare.
Lou Courier, a hedgehog in Lionel's Kingdom
Louis, a hedgehog who is Peaches' best friend in Ice Age: Continental Drift
Molester Mole, in Pogo
Monty Mole, a mole in the Mario franchise.
Morocco Mole, Secret Squirrel's sidekick from Secret Squirrel
Niglo and Niglotte, a pair of French hedgehog mascots.
Paulie, a mole in Fix und Foxi 
Poppy, a hedgehog in Shirobako 
Mr. Pricklepants, a thespian hedgehog toy from Toy Story 3 
Ruby, a hedgehog in Saint Tail 
Russell the hedgehog, with a big appetite from Once Upon a Forest
Russell Ferguson, from the 2012 TV series, Littlest Pet Shop.
Sacha, a Russian desman in Noah's Island
Shadow, from the Sonic the Hedgehog series
Silver from the Sonic the Hedgehog series
Sonic, from the Sonic the Hedgehog series
Speckles, a star-nosed mole from G-Force
Stickly-Prickly, a hedgehog who is one of the protagonists of Just So Stories
Stops, a hedgehog who forms a duo with Hops the hare in Rolf Kauka's Fix und Foxi comics.
Tenjik, a hedgehog in Blazer Drive
Mrs. Tiggy-Winkle, from The Tale of Mrs. Tiggy-Winkle
Una, Dos, and Cuarto, hedgehogs in Ferdinand who are one of Ferdinand's closest friends who steal food from Casa Del Toro.
Shrew, in Redwall
Shrews from The Killer Shrews
Sable, Mabel, and Label, a trio of hedgehog sisters who run the Able Sisters in Animal Crossing

Lagomorphs (rabbits, hares, pikas)
See List of fictional rabbits and hares
Pikachu, a large-eared pika-like Pokémon in Pokémon
Relic, a pika in Sonic the Hedgehog (Archie Comics)

Marsupials (kangaroos, wallabies, wallaroos, koalas, opossums, Tasmanian devils, wombats)
See List of fictional marsupials

Monotremes (platypuses, echidnas)

Platypuses
Alice, a platypus from The Koala Brothers
Ana Platypus, Dr. Duckbill Platypus, and Elsie Jean Platypus from Mr Rogers' Neighborhood TV Series
Edward and his brothers, the platypus characters in Camp Lazlo
Fish, a platypus from Beyond the Stump
Flap, a friend of Blinky Bill
Flappy Freddy, a red platypus who appears in a comic strip by Olivia Dibenedetto.
Hexley, the platypus mascot of the Darwin operating system
Kamo, a yellow platypus in Sabagebu!
Ovide, a platypus in Ovide and the Gang
Plato, Platty and Platter from the Wild Kratts episode "Platypus Cafe"
Perry the Platypus ("secret agent P") from the Disney Channel series of Phineas and Ferb
Syd, the platypus mascot of the 2000 Summer Olympics
Patricia the platypus is a regular character in Spliced
The Platypus King, a three platypus in Super Robot Wars

Echidnas
Floyd, an echidna rocker in Beyond the Black Stump
Julie-Su, a female echidna from Sonic the Hedgehog
Knuckles, an echidna from the Sonic the Hedgehog series
Millie, the echidna mascot of the 2000 Summer Olympics
Icky, a giant echidna from the 2006 game, Rampage: Total Destruction
Sammy, an Echidna from The Koala Brothers

Fictional monotreme species
Multiple characters belonging to the Marsupilami species,  from the Belgian comic series Spirou et Fantasio and the spin-off comic series Marsupilami

Pangolins
Bic and Bac, pangolins in Spartakus and the Sun Beneath the Sea
Artichoke, a baby Chinese pangolin in the "Pangolin Rescue" episode of Wild Kratts
T. Rex, a ground pangolin in the "Pangolin Rescue" episode of Wild Kratts
Pangolins in Khumba
The pangolin in The Pandemic Special
Pango, a pangolin in The Wild Life
Strombonin, the cold island mythical that appears in My Singing Monsters which has a symbiosis relationship with the strombone, a conch snail-like monster that makes a sound of a trombone

Primates
See List of fictional primates

Rodents
See List of fictional rodents

Ungulates (cattle, equines, deer, camels, giraffes, pigs, elephants, rhinoceroses)
See List of fictional ungulates
See also List of fictional horses
See also List of fictional pachyderms (elephants, rhinoceroses, hippopotami)
See also List of fictional pigs

Cetaceans (whales, dolphins, porpoises)

Whales
 Bailey, a beluga whale in Finding Dory
 Big Ben, a sperm whale with a clock on the tip of his tail in Rudolph's Shiny New Year and its prequel Rudolph and Frosty's Christmas in July
 Boris, a whale in William Steig's book Amos and Boris
 Bubbie, a blue sperm whale in The Marvelous Misadventures of Flapjack
 Eanal,a blue grey whale in Ponio (franchise)
 George and Gracie, the humpback whales in Star Trek IV: The Voyage Home
 Hoe, a whale in One Piece
 Irion, a white whale in Nadia: The Secret of Blue Water
 Laboon, a sperm whale in One Piece
 Leelu, a female narwhal in Futurama: Bender's Big Score
 Moby Dick, a whale in the novel Moby-Dick (also often incorrectly spelt without the hyphen) by Herman Melville
 Monstro, the whale in Pinocchio (1940 Disney film)
 Munko, a white sperm whale created by David Choe that has been widely popular in memes
 Mystic Whale, in Tsubasa Chronicle
 Pearl Krabs, a female sperm whale in SpongeBob SquarePants
 Porpoider, a beluga in Kenran Butohsai
 Precious, Sid's grandmother's pet whale in Ice Age 4: Continental Drift
 Tonga, a distressed whale in need of Dot's help in the film Dot and the Whale
 Whale, a whale in Tantei Opera Milky Holmes
 Winona, a purple bath toy whale in Rubbadubbers

Dolphins (including Orcas)

 Alfin, a dolphin in Kateikyoushi Hitman Reborn!
 Bubbles, a bottlenose dolphin in The SpongeBob Movie: Sponge Out of Water
 Crazy Dolphin, a dolphin from Zig and Sharko.
 Dr. Blowhole, a bottlenose dolphin enemy in The Penguins of Madagascar
 Daniel, a bottlenose dolphin in The Dolphin: Story of a Dreamer
 Darwin a bottlenose dolphin and part of the crew in the show seaQuest DSV
Ecco, a male bottlenose dolphin and the titular protagonist of the Ecco the Dolphin franchise
 Ihachigo and Ikyūgō, a dolphin Zettai Karen Children
 Mr. Blowhole, a Killer whale in My Gym Partner's a Monkey
 Flipper, the titular dolphin of the Flipper TV shows and movies
 Orca, a killer whale which ate Flaky, Cuddles and Russell in "Snow Place to Go"
 Ooloorie Eckickeck P'Wheet, a female bottlenose dolphin in the novel The Probability Broach
 Orca, an orca that rescues the penguins from getting eaten by a leopard seal in Scamper the Penguin.
 Sakamata, the orca who cannot swim, from Damekko Dōbutsu
 Ruka, a white dolphin, in Umi no Triton
 Snowflake, a bottlenose dolphin mascot of the Miami Dolphins, from Ace Ventura:Pet Detective
 Wai, a Commerson's dolphin in Aquatica
 White Dolphin, in After War Gundam X
 Willy, a killer whale in the film series Free Willy
 Willzyx, an orca in the South Park episode "Free Willzyx"
 Zoom the White Dolphin

Porpoises
 Bangor, a harbour porpoise in the book A Dog's Porpoise 
 President Porpoise, a porpoise in Adventure Time
 Porpoises in the children's book Science Squad: Porpoises in Peril

Sirenians (dugongs and manatees) 
Benjamin, are hers alana in The Little Mermaid: Ariel's Beginning
Supermanatee, spoof superman in Farm League
Manatee, in episode "The Bonfire of the Manatees" in The Simpsons
Juju, a dugong stuffed toy in Puka Puka Juju
Kung Fu Dugong, a dugong in One Piece

Xenarthrans (armadillos, anteaters, sloths)
Armalady from Princess Tutu
Armored Armadillo robotic armadillo from Mega Man X
Army Dillo, an armadillo who is King K. Rool's minion and the first boss from the Nintendo 64 game Donkey Kong 64.
Anteater, a tamandua from Shirokuma Cafe
Anteaterina, a female anteater from Princess Tutu
Bob in It’s a Big Big World
Charlie, an anteater in Rio 2
Chillax, a brown-throated sloth in the "Rainforest Stew" episode of Wild Kratts
Dillon from Dillon's Rolling Western
Eduardo, a sloth-like imaginary friend in Foster’s Home for Imaginary Friends
Flash, a three-toed sloth who works at the DMV (Department of Mammal Vehicles) in Zootopia
Henry Armadillo from My Gym Partner's a Monkey.
Kincho, an armadillo in Deadman Wonderland
Marianne, a sloth in Soul Eater Not!
Mighty the Armadillo, a recurring protagonist in the Classic sector of the Sonic the Hedgehog franchise.
Noah, a sloth in Eureka Seven AO
Oto, an anteater in Doki
Riona, Snook’s baby niece who is introduced in Season 2 of It’s a Big Big World
Sid a Megatherium, in Ice Age
Sniffles, an anteater in Happy Tree Friends
Snipe Anteator, robotic anteater from Mega Man X7
Snook, a sloth who is the titular character in It’s a Big Big World
Sheriff Toothpick, an armadillo who is an antagonist in Sly Cooper: Thieves in Time
Trueno, a tough-Mexican wrestling armadillo in El Americano: The Movie

Others
Colin, a hyrax in The Wild
Tickles, a Megazostrodon in The Land Before Time IV: Journey Through the Mists
Hyrax, in Ice Age: Continental Drift
Skip, a Multituberculate in The Land Before Time
Gold, a tenrec in Sonic the Hedgehog (Archie Comics)
Natasha, a golden mole in Noah's Island
Kuchimba, a golden mole from The Lion Guard
Civets in Jungle Emperor Leo
Genet, a genet in The Lion Guard
Rhinogradentia, an entire fictional order of shrew-like mammals

Non-mammal vertebrates

Fish
See List of fictional fish

Amphibians
See List of fictional frogs and toads
Casey/Viceroy Bubbles Von Salamancer, the necromancing Salamander from Homestuck.
Lurchi, the fire salamander mascot of the German Salamander shoe factories.
Newton, a newt blue shapeshifters in Ned's Newt
King Andrias Leviathan, a towering newt in Amphibia
Leopold Loggle an axolotl in Amphibia

Reptiles
See List of fictional reptiles
See also List of fictional crocodiles and alligators
See also List of fictional dinosaurs
See also List of fictional snakes
See also List of fictional turtles

Birds
See List of fictional birds
See also List of fictional birds of prey
See also List of fictional ducks
See also List of fictional penguins

Invertebrates

Arthropods
See List of fictional arthropods

Echinoderms (starfish, sea urchins, sea cucumbers, etc.)
Magical Wishing Starfish - a starfish in The Little Mermaid
Pappug, a starfish One Piece
Patrick Star, a starfish from the animated series SpongeBob SquarePants
Kevin C. Cucumber, a sea cucumber from the SpongeBob SquarePants episode "I'm Your Biggest Fanatic"
Peach, a member of the Tank Gang in Finding Nemo.
Sploshy, a pink starfish in Rubbadubbers
Spyke, a sea urchin in Splatoon
Urchin, a sea urchin enemy in the Mario franchise

Mollusks

Cephalopods (octopuses, squids)
Ammonite, in Dinosaur Hour
Betty the octopus from Hey Duggee.
Carl, a squid who is friends with Daniel in The Dolphin: Story of a Dreamer
Cranchee, a dreamythical monster from My Singing Monsters that sprung from the Strombone's imagination that appears exclusively on Mythical Island. This fictional species has both aquatic and glacial features. The Cranchee sings "boodap-badimbo" in a distorted voice, using its mouth as well as the loudspeaker-like hand cups. It makes a sound similar to what drill rappers use.
Ellie, an octopus who loves to give out big hugs in the ocean in the Sprout kids' show Pajanimals
Geirus, a squidlike in Tentai Senshi Sunred
Gl'bgolyb, a lovecraftian parental figure to Feferi, from Homestuck.
Henry the Octopus, from The Wiggles
Ika Musume
Ika Fire from Futakoi Alternative
Inkling Octopus, in The Octonauts
Kanaloa, an octopus in Fairy Tail
Nachiko, a squid costume boy in Pugyuru
Octopus Nakajima, in My Bride Is a Mermaid
Octopus, in Old Crocodile
Octopus, a villain in the Disney's Peter Pan sequel Return to Never Land
Oswald, an octopus from Oswald
Pearl, a young octopus in Finding Nemo who has a tendency to squirt ink
Squiddly Diddly, an animated squid from The Atom Ant/Secret Squirrel Show
Squidward Tentacles, an octopus from the animated series SpongeBob SquarePants
Squilliam Fancyson, an octopus from SpongeBob SquarePants
Stretch, a purple octopus toy from Toy Story 3
Takosuke and Belial, from Parodius
 Korosensei, an octopus in Assassination Classroom

Snails and slugs
Brian, in The Magic Roundabout
Gary the Snail, a sea snail in SpongeBob SquarePants
Slug, in Flushed Away
Crystal Snail, a robotic snail in Mega Man X3
Katsuyu, a slug in Naruto
Peek-a-Boo, a snail in Suzy's Zoo
Turbo or Theo, a garden snail in Turbo
 Schneider Snail from Hermie and Friends
Simon Snail, from the British series Small Potatoes.
 Lilla the snail from the Swedish children's song Lilla snigel.
Shelldon Cargo, in Channel Umptee-3
Sid the Slug
Slinkman, a banana slug in Camp Lazlo
Smudge, a slug in Bionic Max
Snail Ghost, in Di Gi Charat
Snail, a male snail who is friends with Franklin in Franklin
Snail, a snail who got transformed into a pig by Chef Pig in the Angry Birds Toons episode, 'Pig Plot Potion'
Speedy, a snail from Timon & Pumbaa
Sput, a slug in Bionic Max
Escargoon, from the Kirby T.V. show
The Pink Snail from Doctor Dolittle
Bessie, a giant snail in Amphibia (TV series)
Scargo, a wublin in My Singing Monsters. It has cymbals in its eyes.

Bivalves
Clamperl, a bivalve-like Pokémon in Pokémon
Hosenki, an oyster monster in InuYasha
Shijimi Clam Ghost, a clam in Di Gi Charat
Scallops and clams from SpongeBob SquarePants
The oyster from The Mouse and the Oyster

Jellyfish
Ernie and Bernie, two Jamaican-accented jellyfish in Shark Tale
Kulala, a jellyfish in Princess Jellyfish
Lispel, a jellyfish from Dutch cartoon, Alfred J. Kwak
Jellyfish in SpongeBob SquarePants
Metroids, a jellyfish-like species in Metroid

Water bears
The Grass Bear, a character belonging to a fictional tardigrade species in the Adventure Time episode "Blade of Grass"
Tad Mulholland, a water bear in Kipo and the Age of Wonderbeasts
Water bears from the South Park episode "Moss Piglets"
Talking Water bears from the Family Guy episode "Big Trouble in Little Quahog"

Others
See also List of fictional parasites
See also List of fictional worms
The comb jelly from The Octonauts episode "Octonauts and the Giant Comb Jelly"
SpongeBob SquarePants, a sponge in SpongeBob SquarePants

References

Miscellaneous
Other
Other